Janos (Istvan) Magyar (born 1927) was a Hungarian footballer who played in the 1950s. He played as a striker.

Magyar first played for Brühl St. Gallen. He joined FC Basel's first team for their 1957–58 season under manager Rudi Strittich. Magyar played his domestic league debut for his new club in the home game at the Landhof on 10 November 1957 as Basel won 3–2 against Bellinzona. He scored his first goal for his club on 23 March 1958 in the away game against Grenchen as Basel won 4–3.

Magyar played only this one season for Basel. He played a total of 18 games scoring just this one goal. Nine of these games were in the Nationalliga A, one in the Swiss Cup and eight were friendly games.

References

Sources
 Die ersten 125 Jahre. Publisher: Josef Zindel im Friedrich Reinhardt Verlag, Basel. 
 Verein "Basler Fussballarchiv" Homepage
(NB: Despite all efforts, the editors of these books and the authors in "Basler Fussballarchiv" have failed to be able to identify all the players, their date and place of birth or date and place of death, who played in the games during the early years of FC Basel)

SC Brühl players
FC Basel players
Hungarian footballers
Association football forwards
1927 births
Living people